John C. Karel, Sr., (or Carel) (March 29, 1851 was a Bohemian American immigrant, banker, and Democratic politician.  He was a member of the Wisconsin State Assembly, representing Kewaunee County during the 1879 session.  During the presidency of Grover Cleveland, he served as U.S. consul at Prague and Saint Petersburg.

Biography
John Karel was born in March 1851, in the village of Nemecká, in what was then Zólyom County in the Kingdom of Hungary—the area is now central Slovakia.  His early life was spent in Prague and Plzeň,  and he received a collegiate education at the Plzeň Gymnasium.  He emigrated to the United States and settled at Kewaunee, Wisconsin, in 1868.

He served as chairman of the Kewaunee County Board of Supervisors and was elected to the Wisconsin State Assembly in 1878, running on the Democratic Party ticket.  He ran for Wisconsin State Senate in 1880, but was defeated by Republican William A. Ellis.

Karel was the Democratic nominee for the statewide elected office Wisconsin Insurance Commissioner in the 1886 general election.  He was defeated along with the entire Democratic ticket.  A month after his election loss, he accepted appointment as vice-consul to Prague, in Austria-Hungary, under U.S. consul-general Charles Jonas.  He remained in the office through the end of U.S. President Grover Cleveland's first term, in 1889, and afterward moved to Chicago, Illinois.

In Chicago he was a partner in a banking business known as Kasper & Karel, which was considered the leading banking institution for Bohemian American merchants in Chicago.  When Grover Cleveland returned to office in 1893, Karel was re-appointed to the consulate in Prague, and then, in 1894, he was appointed consul-general at Saint Petersburg, which was then the capital of the Russian Empire.

After returning from his diplomatic missions, he resumed his interest in banking and was one of the founders of the American State Bank in Chicago, where he served as president until his retirement.

He retired due to poor health about 1912.  His health continued to decline and he went to live with his daughter, Flora, in Minneapolis, Minnesota.  He died there on August 23, 1914.

Personal life and family
John Karel married Elizabeth Metzner in 1871.  They had at least three children before her death in 1883.  Their eldest son,  was a member of the Wisconsin State Assembly, a county judge in Milwaukee County, Wisconsin, and the Democratic nominee for Governor of Wisconsin in 1912 and 1914.

Electoral history

Wisconsin Assembly (1878)

| colspan="6" style="text-align:center;background-color: #e9e9e9;"| General Election, November 5, 1878

Wisconsin Senate (1880)

| colspan="6" style="text-align:center;background-color: #e9e9e9;"| General Election, November 2, 1880

Wisconsin Insurance Commissioner (1886)

| colspan="6" style="text-align:center;background-color: #e9e9e9;"| General Election, November 2, 1886

Notes

References

External links
 

1851 births
1914 deaths
Hungarian emigrants to the United States
People from Brezno District
People from Kewaunee County, Wisconsin
Businesspeople from Chicago
County supervisors in Wisconsin
Illinois Democrats
American bank presidents
American consuls
Democratic Party members of the Wisconsin State Assembly